Daniel Hanmer Wells (October 27, 1814 – March 24, 1891) was an American apostle of the Church of Jesus Christ of Latter-day Saints (LDS Church) and the 3rd mayor of Salt Lake City.

Biography

Early life
Wells was born in Trenton, New York, a member of the sixth generation of his family in America. His original immigrant ancestor was Thomas Welles (1594–1660), who arrived in Massachusetts in 1635 and was the only man in Connecticut's history to hold all four top offices: governor, deputy governor, treasurer, and secretary. Wells was also a descendant of John Webster, fifth governor of Connecticut. A few years after the death of his father in 1826, Daniel H. Wells left New York with his mother Catherine Chapin Wells and his younger sister Catherine C. Wells and moved to Illinois.

Wells arrived in Hancock County, Illinois, in 1835. He lived in Commerce, Illinois—later renamed Nauvoo—and was a major landowner and justice of the peace there for several years prior to the arrival of large numbers of Latter Day Saints in 1839.

Relationship with the Latter-day Saints
Although not a member of the Latter-day Saints, Wells was considered by opponents of the church to be a "Jack Mormon", a term originally applied to non-members who were friendly to or defended the Latter Day Saints. In Nauvoo, he served on the city council and as a judge.

Mobs invaded Nauvoo after the assassination of church founder Joseph Smith; Wells defended the city and fought as a Lieutenant General of the Nauvoo Legion, and also provided shelter for evacuees. Wells was not baptized into the LDS Church until August 9, 1846. He emigrated to the Salt Lake Valley with the Mormon pioneers in 1848.

Well respected for his integrity and loyal service, he was elected Attorney General of State of Deseret in 1849. When Jedediah M. Grant died in 1856, Wells was ordained an apostle of the LDS Church and set apart as Second Counselor to Brigham Young in the First Presidency of the church. Although serving as an apostle, Wells was never sustained as a member of the Quorum of Twelve Apostles. Upon Young's death in 1877, Wells was sustained as a Counselor to the Quorum of the Twelve Apostles, a position he held until his death.

On behalf of Brigham Young, Wells dedicated the St. George Temple on April 6, 1877. From 1888 to 1891, he was the first president of the Manti Utah Temple.

From 1848 until 1863, Wells was superintendent of public works for the LDS Church and presided over the continuing construction of the Salt Lake Temple (completed 1893) and the Salt Lake Tabernacle (completed 1867). When Wells was no longer in the position, the operation of the church's public works program was placed under the supervision of the Presiding Bishopric.

In 1866, Wells was elected mayor of Salt Lake City as a member of the newly formed People's Party; he was re-elected in both 1872 and 1874. In 1871, he was arrested by U.S. marshals on charges related to polygamy. Wells served twice as president of the European Mission of the LDS Church, first in 1864–65 and again in 1884–87.

Extermination order against Timpanogos

On January 31, 1850, Wells drafted orders for Captain George D. Grant to exterminate the Timpanogos, known as Special Order No. 2.  The decision was the result of a meeting with Isaac Higbee, bishop of Fort Utah, together with the First Presidency and the Quorum of the Twelve Apostles. Higbee reported conflict between the pioneers and the Timpanogos, and it was unanimously decided the only way to keep Fort Utah would be to exterminate the Timpanogos.

The initial detachment commenced battle on February 8, 1850 under Captain Grant.  However, after hearing reports of poor attitude of the settlers in working with Grants's troops, Brigham Young asked Wells to lead a detachment.  On February 11, Wells arrived and split the army into two. One contingent followed the trail of some Timpanogos who had fled up Rock Canyon.  Wells led the other contingent south towards Spanish Fork river.  He divided them into smaller parties and searched the southern valley for native peoples to kill. On February 14, at Table Rock near the southeastern shore of Utah lake, one of the smaller hunting parties captured a band of Utes. Lieutenant Gunnison of the Stansbury Expedition reported that the Mormons promised to be friendly to the Timpanogos men, but then lined up the men to be executed in front of their families. Some attempted to flee across the frozen lake, but the Mormons ran after them on horseback and shot them. At least eleven Ute men were killed.  In total, one militia man and an estimated 102 Timpanogos were killed.

Personal life

Wells married Eliza Rebecca Robison in 1837 and with her had one son, Albert Emory Wells. His wife refused to accompany Wells to Utah in 1848 and later divorced him. Between 1849 and 1852, Wells married six additional wives: Louisa Free, with whom he had eight children; Martha Givens Harris, with whom he had seven children; Lydia Ann Alley, with whom he had six children; Susan Hannah Alley, with whom he had four children; Hannah Corilla Free, with whom he had eight children; and Emmeline Blanche Woodward, with whom he had three children. Louisa Free, Hannah Free, and Emmeline Woodward were all previously married and divorced or widowed. Each had one or more children whom Wells adopted and reared as his own.

In 1852, Wells married his seventh wife, future Relief Society General President Emmeline B. Wells. She bore him three daughters.

Marriages and Children:
 March 12, 1837 in Nauvoo, Illinois to Eliza Rebecca Robison (January 4, 1820 in Cincinnati, OH-August 2, 1905 in Alma, MI); divorced May 1848
 Albert Emory Wells (March 28, 1839 in Nauvoo, IL-January 26, 1916 in Belding, MI)
 John Brigham Wells (February 25, 1846 in Nauvoo, IL-February 25, 1846 in Nauvoo, IL)
February 15, 1849 in Salt Lake City, Utah to Louisa Free (August 9, 1824 in Fayetteville, IL-June 18, 1886 in Salt Lake City, UT)
Daniel Hanmer Wells Jr. (November 24, 1849 in Salt Lake City, UT-September 19, 1926 in Salt Lake City, UT)
Frances Louisa Wells (March 13, 1852 in Salt Lake City, UT-March 5, 1944 in Salt Lake City, UT)
Rulon Seymour Wells (July 7, 1854 in Salt Lake City, UT-May 7, 1941 in Salt Lake City, UT)
Emeline Young Wells (April 13, 1857 in Salt Lake City, UT-March 17, 1941 in Salt Lake City, UT)
Eliza Free Lyde Wells (October 3, 1859 in Salt Lake City, UT-December 2, 1940 in Salt Lake City, UT)
Clara Ellen Wells (October 23, 1862 in Salt Lake City, UT-April 30, 1946 in Salt Lake City, UT)
Melvin Dickinson Wells (July 31, 1867 in Salt Lake City, UT-September 11, 1941 in Salt Lake City, UT)
September 20, 1849 in Salt Lake City, Utah to Martha Givens Harris (March 27, 1832 in Lebanon, TN-May 12, 1908 in Salt Lake City, UT)
Emily Harris Wells (April 22, 1857 in Salt Lake City, UT-May 25, 1908 in Salt Lake City, UT)
Heber Manning Wells (August 11, 1859 in Salt Lake City, UT-March 12, 1938 in Salt Lake City, UT)
Joseph Smith Wells (May 25, 1862 in Salt Lake City, UT-October 18, 1916 in Salt Lake City, UT)
Herman Chapman Wells (February 13, 1867 in Salt Lake City, UT-September 8, 1868 in Salt Lake City, UT)
Edna Margaret Wells (July 5, 1869 in Salt Lake City, UT-July 5, 1935 in Salt Lake City, UT)
Briant Harris Wells (December 5, 1871 in Salt Lake City, UT-June 10, 1949 in Long Beach, CA)
April 4, 1852 in Salt Lake City, Utah to Lydia Ann Alley (January 1, 1828 in Lynn, MA-August 6, 1909 in Salt Lake City, UT)
Catherine Alley Wells (March 28, 1853 in Salt Lake City, UT-November 10, 1922 in Salt Lake City, UT)
Mary Minerva Wells (December 10, 1854 in Salt Lake City, UT-January 25, 1935 in Salt Lake City, UT)
Lucy Ann Wells (December 4, 1858 in Salt Lake City, UT-October 23, 1859 in Salt Lake City, UT)
Louis Robinson Wells (December 21, 1862 in Salt Lake City, UT-November 23, 1952 in Salt Lake City, UT)
Wilford Woodruff Wells (June 21, 1868 in Salt Lake City, UT-October 10, 1868 in Salt Lake City, UT)
Arthur Deming Wells (September 1, 1871 in Salt Lake City, UT-December 1, 1871 in Salt Lake City, UT)
April 18, 1852 in Salt Lake City, Utah to Susan Hannah Alley (May 3, 1830 in Lynn, MA-May 5, 1924 in Salt Lake City, UT; sister of Lydia above)
Susan Annette Wells (November 28, 1857 in Salt Lake City, UT-November 21, 1929 in Salt Lake City, UT)
George Alley Wells (December 18, 1859 in Salt Lake City, UT-July 24, 1872 in Salt Lake City, UT)
Stephen Franklin Wells (June 25, 1867 in Salt Lake City, UT-July 23, 1958)
Charles Henry Wells (August 28, 1870 in Salt Lake City, UT-December 31, 1944 in Salt Lake City, UT)
August 6, 1852 in Salt Lake City, Utah to Hannah Corilla Free (June 9, 1829 in Belleville, IL-March 6, 1913 in Salt Lake City, UT; sister of Louisa above)
Abbie Corilla Wells (September 20, 1852 in Salt Lake City, UT-September 25, 1930 in Salt Lake City, UT)
Junius Free Wells (June 1, 1854 in Salt Lake City, UT-April 15, 1930 in Salt Lake City, UT)
Luna Pamela Wells (August 24, 1856 in Salt Lake City, UT-November 4, 1857 in Salt Lake City, UT)
Brigham Wells (April 14, 1859 in Salt Lake City, UT-October 26, 1863 in Salt Lake City, UT)
Preston Strait Wells (May 11, 1861 in Salt Lake City, UT-June 4, 1861 in Salt Lake City, UT)
Ephraim Willard Wells (September 17, 1863 in Salt Lake City, UT-October 18, 1863 in Salt Lake City, UT)
Gershom Britain Finley Wells (November 19, 1864 in Lancashire, England-May 21, 1944 in Salt Lake City, UT)
Victor Pennington Wells (May 18, 1868 in Salt Lake City, UT-January 3, 1927 in Lancaster, PA)
October 18, 1852 in Salt Lake City, Utah to Emmeline Blanche Woodward (February 29, 1828 in Petersham, MA-April 25, 1921 in Salt Lake City, UT)
Emma Whitney Wells (September 10, 1853 in Salt Lake City, UT-April 8, 1878 in Salt Lake City, UT)
Elizabeth Wells Cannon (Elizabeth Ann "Annie" Wells) (December 7, 1859 in Salt Lake City, UT-September 2, 1942 in Salt Lake City, UT) 
Louisa Martha "Louie" Wells (August 27, 1862 in Salt Lake City, UT-May 16, 1887 in Salt Lake City, UT)
November 14, 1871 in Salt Lake City, Utah to Hannah Tupper (March 23, 1823 in Parishville, NY-December 15, 1893 in Loa, UT)

Wells died in Salt Lake City at the age of 76 and was buried at Salt Lake City Cemetery. Wells's son by his wife Martha G. Harris, Heber Manning Wells, was the first governor of the state of Utah, serving from 1896 to 1905.

See also
 Junius F. Wells
 Wells–Bennett–Grant Family

References

External links 

 Grampa Bill's G.A. Pages: Daniel H. Wells

1814 births
1891 deaths
19th-century American politicians
American general authorities (LDS Church)
Apostles (LDS Church)
Burials at Salt Lake City Cemetery
Converts to Mormonism
Counselors in the First Presidency (LDS Church)
Latter Day Saints from Illinois
Latter Day Saints from Utah
Mayors of Salt Lake City
Members of the Utah Territorial Legislature
Mission presidents (LDS Church)
Mormon pioneers
Mormonism and violence
Nauvoo Legion
Nauvoo, Illinois city council members
People from Trenton, New York
People of the Utah War
People's Party (Utah) politicians
Temple presidents and matrons (LDS Church)